Kristina Heigenhauser (born Kristina Berger, 20 June 1988) is a German compound archer. She achieved a career high world ranking of 2 in women's compound archery in 2013. She has won medals at the FITA Archery World Cup, reaching the World Cup Finals in 2012 and 2013, the World Archery Championships and the World Games.

Before taking up archery, Berger was a three time national pistol shooting champion.

References

German female archers
Living people
1988 births
World Archery Championships medalists
World Games bronze medalists
Competitors at the 2013 World Games
World Games medalists in archery
21st-century German women